Nicolae Dărăscu (February 18, 1883 – August 14, 1959) was a Romanian painter. He was influenced by Impressionism and Neo-impressionism.

Biography
Born in Giurgiu, he studied painting at the Academy of Fine Arts in Bucharest between 1902 and 1906, in the class of George Demetrescu Mirea. After graduation, he was awarded a scholarship to the Académie Julian in Paris (which, as an admirer of its former students Nicolae Grigorescu and Ştefan Luchian, he had wanted to attend). He studied under Jean-Paul Laurens and a year later, in 1907 at the École des Beaux-Arts under Luc-Olivier Merson.

He traveled extensively and lived in the south of France (Toulon and Saint-Tropez, 1908), to Venice (1909), in Romania (to Vlaici, Olt County, 1913, and in Southern Dobruja - Balchik, 1919). He maintained permanent contacts with artists from other European cultures, visiting major art museums and extending his horizons to attempt new forms of artistic expression. Unlike many of his contemporaries, Dărăscu rarely painted interiors or still lifes.

In 1917, along with the painters Camil Ressu, Ștefan Dimitrescu, Iosif Iser, Marius Bunescu and the sculptors Dimitrie Paciurea, Cornel Medrea, Ion Jalea and Oscar Han, he founded the Arta Română association in Iaşi.

Aside from his artistic pursuits, Dărăscu was a professor at the Academy of Fine Arts in Bucharest between 1936 and 1950.

References

External links

Biography at artnet.com
Nicolae Dărăscu at Art Museum Braşov
 Biography

1883 births
1959 deaths
Romanian Impressionist painters
People from Giurgiu
Academic staff of the Bucharest National University of Arts
Romanian painters
École des Beaux-Arts alumni